Menhdawal is a constituency of the Uttar Pradesh Legislative Assembly covering the city of Menhdawal in the Sant Kabir Nagar district of Uttar Pradesh in India.

Menhdawal is one of five assembly constituencies in the Sant Kabir Nagar Lok Sabha constituency. Since 2008, this assembly constituency is numbered 312 amongst 403 constituencies.

Members of Legislative Assembly (MLAs)

Election results

2022 

Currently this seat belongs to NISHAD Party candidate Anil Kumar Tripathi who won in last Assembly election of 2022 Uttar Pradesh Legislative Elections defeating Samajwadi Party candidate Jai Chand alias Jairam Pandey by a margin of 5,223 votes.

2017

16th Vidhan Sabha: 2012 General Elections

References

External links
 

Assembly constituencies of Uttar Pradesh
Sant Kabir Nagar district